Trigger is the Martin N-20 nylon-string classical acoustic guitar used by country music singer-songwriter Willie Nelson. Early in his career, Nelson tested several guitars by different companies. After his Baldwin guitar was damaged in 1969, he purchased the Martin guitar, but retained the electrical components from the Baldwin guitar.

Nelson based his desired style on Django Reinhardt's playing and guitar sound. He opted to amplify the acoustic guitar, resulting in his signature sound.

Background
As Nelson was an RCA Records artist, several guitar manufacturers would either loan or gift him their instruments to test them. Earlier in his career, Nelson played instruments of the Fender Musical Instruments Corporation, with models including the Telecaster, Jaguar, and Jazzmaster.  Nelson later moved on to Gibson Guitars. In 1969, before a concert at Panamerican Ballroom near Houston, Texas, Baldwin Company gave Nelson the 800C Classical Acoustic-Electric Guitar model with a Prismatone pickup and an amplifier to test.

The Martin N-20
In 1969, after a concert at Floore's Country Store in Helotes, Texas, a drunk man stepped on Nelson's Baldwin, breaking it beyond playability. David Zettner and Jimmy Day, members of Nelson's band The Record Men, took the guitar to Shot Jackson, a luthier in Nashville, Tennessee. Jackson, who considered the damage irreparable, offered Nelson a Martin N-20 nylon-stringed classical guitar made out of Brazilian rosewood with a Sitka spruce top (serial number 242830). Nelson instructed Jackson, during a phone conversation, to move the pickup from the Baldwin to the Martin. The pickup allowed him to amplify his classical acoustic sound to perform in large dance halls, contributing to his signature style. Nelson bought the modified Martin N-20 unseen, for $750. Two decades later, he named it after Roy Rogers' horse "Trigger". When asked about the name, Nelson often replies: "Roy Rogers had a horse named Trigger. I figured, this is my horse!"  Nelson desired approaching the playing style and sound of jazz musician Django Reinhardt.

Nelson first used Trigger during the studio recordings of My Own Peculiar Way the same year, but the sound of the guitar was overwhelmed by the dubbing of strings and brass instruments on the mix. The following year, Nelson saved Trigger from his burning ranch in Bandera, Texas. After Nelson's move to Austin, Texas and the revitalization of his music, Trigger defined his sound. The singer used Trigger in the recording of his acclaimed albums Shotgun Willie, Red Headed Stranger and Stardust.

Appearance

Over time, Nelson has worn a large hole above the bridge, nearly reaching the sound hole. While classical guitars are meant to be played with finger-style picking, Nelson's use of a flatpick, and constant strumming, caused the damage as the pick slowly scrapes away at the wood. Trigger’s wear is so great that even the steel frets have been worn down from smooth ridges to wavey lines by the nylon strings over 10,000 shows of exclusive use.

Its soundboard has been signed by over a hundred of Nelson's friends and associates, such as fellow musicians, lawyers and football coaches. The first signature on the guitar was Leon Russell's, who asked Nelson initially to sign his guitar. When Nelson was about to sign it with a marker, Russell requested him to scratch it instead, explaining that the guitar would be more valuable in the future. Interested in the concept, Nelson requested that Russell also sign his guitar.

Maintenance 
Luthier Mark Erlewine has been doing maintenance and repairs on Trigger since 1977, after meeting Nelson at a bar. The guitar goes to Erlewine once a year for an annual "check-up" in Austin, Texas.

Trigger is prepared for Nelson before each show by his guitar technician, "Tunin' Tom" Hawkins.

Legacy
During his process with the IRS in 1991, Nelson was worried that Trigger could be auctioned off, stating: "When Trigger goes, I'll quit". He asked his daughter, Lana, to take the guitar from the studio before any IRS agent got there, and bring it to him in Maui. Nelson's attorney, Joel Katz, then hid the guitar in his house until the singers' debt was paid in 1993.

In his book, The Tao of Willie: A Guide to Happiness in Your Heart, Nelson described the influence of the guitar in his style: "One of the secrets to my sound is almost beyond explanation. My battered old Martin guitar, Trigger, has the greatest tone I've ever heard from a guitar. ... If I picked up the finest guitar made this year and tried to play my solos exactly the way you heard them on the radio or even at last night's show, I'd always be a copy of myself and we'd all end up bored. But if I play an instrument that is now a part of me, and do it according to the way that feels right for me ... I'll always be an original".

In 2015, Rolling Stone Films presented a documentary, Mastering the Craft: Trigger, which depicts the story of the guitar. Directed by David Chamberlin and narrated by Woody Harrelson, the film features interviews with Nelson, his biographer Joe Nick Patoski, harmonicist Mickey Raphael, and singer Jerry Jeff Walker. 

Due to Trigger's impact within the music industry, Martin Guitars produced the Willie Nelson Limited Edition N-20WN in 1998.

See also
 List of guitars

Footnotes

References

External links
 Video on Trigger

Individual guitars
Willie Nelson
Instruments of musicians